The Jacinth-Ambrosia Mine is a mine operated by Iluka Resources in South Australia. The primary output of the mine is zircon, used in making ceramics. The mine exploits both the Jacinth and Ambrosia deposits which were discovered in 2004. Mining commenced in 2009.

Ore is processed onsite to produce a concentrate which is transported to Thevenard then shipped to a plant at Narngulu in Western Australia for further processing into zircon, rutile and ilmenite. The concentrate is transported to Thevenard by road, with approximately 18 B-triple trucks per day carrying 96 tonnes each. A 100 kilometre unsealed haul road was constructed for the mine, along with upgrading 80 kilometres of the Ooldea Road.

The mine operates inside of the Yellabinna Regional Reserve and is served by Jacinth Ambrosia Airport. Around 70 workers operate on a Fly-in fly-out basis. It is the first mine in South Australia to be approved for development in a regional reserve. Seed and topsoil are collected and stored for later site rehabilitation.

The mineral sands deposit is in tertiary-age sediments of the Eucla Basin.

References

Zirconium mines in Australia
Mines in South Australia